Janq'u Jaqhi (Aymara janq'u white, jaqhi precipice, cliff,  "white cliff", also spelled Jankho Jakke) is a mountain in the Andes of Bolivia which reaches a height of approximately  . It is located in the Oruro Department, Sajama Province, at the border of the municipalities of Curahuara de Carangas and Turco. Janq'u Jaqhi lies southwest of Chilli Qhata.

References 

Mountains of Oruro Department